Danilo "Danny" Israel Acosta Martínez (born 17 November 1997) is a Honduran professional footballer who currently plays for Orange County SC and the Honduras national team.

Club career
After spending time with Real Salt Lake's academy in Arizona, and United Soccer League affiliate, Real Monarchs, Acosta signed a Homegrown Player contract with the club on December 29, 2015.

On December 28, 2018, Acosta joined Orlando City SC on a season-long loan with an option to make the transfer permanent at the end of the season, in exchange for $75,000 of General Allocation Money. Orlando declined to make the transfer permanent. Acosta's contract option with Real Salt Lake was also declined, leaving him as a free agent at the end of the 2019 season.

On November 25, 2019, the LA Galaxy selected Acosta for the end of year Waiver Draft. He officially signed for the club on January 8, 2020. On February 15 Acosta tore his ACL and missed out on the entire 2020 season. Following the 2021 season, Acosta was released by the Galaxy.

On January 7, 2022 Acosta signed with USL Championship side Orange County SC ahead of their 2022 season.

International career
Acosta was selected in the United States U18 36-player training camp in October 2014, but has yet to represent the United States. On January 3, 2016, Acosta was named in Tab Ramos' United States U20 January training camp.

Acosta won the 2017 CONCACAF U-20 Championship with the United States, and represented the United States at the 2017 FIFA U-20 World Cup in South Korea.

He received his first and so far only call up to the U.S. senior national team camp in January 2018.

With no senior caps to his name, Acosta remained eligible for his country of birth and was selected to represent Honduras at the 2019 Gold Cup. Having failed to make an appearance for the team, Acosta declined to sign a letter of intent from FIFA confirming his one-time switch of allegiance to Honduras following their elimination from the competition.

On June 16, 2021, the Football Federation of Honduras declared that Acosta had decided to, permanently, represent Honduras at the international level and that FIFA had, already, approved his petition. He debuted with Honduras in a 0–0 2022 FIFA World Cup qualification tie with El Salvador on 5 September 2021.

Club statistics

Honors
United States U20
CONCACAF Under-20 Championship: 2017

References

External links
 

USSF Development Academy bio

1997 births
Living people
People from San Pedro Sula
People from Sandy, Utah
Honduran footballers
Honduras international footballers
American soccer players
United States men's under-20 international soccer players
American people of Honduran descent
Honduran emigrants to the United States
Association football defenders
Homegrown Players (MLS)
LA Galaxy players
LA Galaxy II players
Major League Soccer players
Orange County SC players
Orlando City SC players
Real Monarchs players
Real Salt Lake players
Soccer players from Utah
USL Championship players